Francisco António Machado Mota de Castro Trincão (born 29 December 1999) is a Portuguese professional footballer who plays as a winger for Primeira Liga club Sporting CP, on loan from Barcelona, and the Portugal national team.

He started his career with Braga B, making his debut with the first team in 2018 and winning the 2019–20 Taça da Liga in his second season with the club. In January 2020, he signed with Barcelona for a reported €31 million fee, with the deal made effective in July. He then spent two years on loan, at Wolverhampton Wanderers and Sporting CP.

Trincão is a former Portugal youth international, representing his country at various youth levels and being part of the under-19 team that won the 2018 European Championship where he was crowned top scorer. He made his senior international debut in 2020.

Club career

Braga
Born in Viana do Castelo, Trincão began his youth career with hometown club Vianense. He also had a spell at Porto and two at Braga, where he finished his development.

Trincão made his senior debut on 2 April 2016 for Braga's reserves in Segunda Liga, as an 81st-minute substitute for Carlos Fortes in a 2–1 away loss against Freamunde. He scored his first senior goal on 7 May 2017, but in a 2–3 home defeat to Porto's reserves. He scored five times in 2017–18, including twice on 1 October in a 5–4 home win over Nacional for a first victory of the season, and signed a new five-year contract at the end.

On 28 December 2018, Trincão played his first competitive match with the first team in a 4–0 victory at Vitória de Setúbal in the group stage of the Taça da Liga where he replaced Fransérgio in the 62nd minute. Five days later, manager Abel Ferreira gave him a Primeira Liga debut when he came on for Dyego Sousa for the last four minutes of a home defeat of Marítimo.

Trincão scored his first goal for Braga on 12 December 2019 in the last group phase game of the UEFA Europa League, also assisting in the 4–2 win at Slovan Bratislava as his team advanced in first place. The following 4 January, given a first league start by new manager Rúben Amorim, he scored his first domestic league goal in a 7–1 away demolition of Belenenses SAD. Three weeks later, he was a 50th-minute replacement for Galeno as the Arsenalistas won the league cup final against Porto at the Estádio Municipal de Braga.

Barcelona
On 31 January 2020, Barcelona announced the transfer of Trincão, initially effective on 1 July. He signed a five-year contract for a €31 million fee, with a buyout clause of €500 million. He made his La Liga debut on 27 September, playing 12 minutes of the 4–0 home victory over Villarreal. He was handed his first start on 20 October in the 5–1 home rout of Ferencváros in the group stage of the UEFA Champions League, replacing Antoine Griezmann as the starting right winger and putting up a good performance.

Trincão scored his first goal on 7 February 2021, closing the 3–2 away win against Real Betis in the domestic league. He added a brace the following weekend after assists by Ilaix Moriba and Lionel Messi, helping the hosts defeat Alavés 5–1.

On 4 July 2021, Trincão joined Wolverhampton Wanderers on a season-long loan, subject to medical and work permit and with an option to make the move permanent in the future; he reunited with Pedro Neto, with whom he had played as a child with Vianense and Braga. He made his Premier League debut on 14 August, starting in a 1–0 loss away to Leicester City. His first goal came ten days later, as a second-half substitute in a 4–0 victory at Nottingham Forest in the second round of the EFL Cup.

Trincão registered his first Premier League goal (also providing his first assist in the competition) in a 3–2 defeat at home to Leeds United on 18 March 2022, having come on as a first-half substitute for injured Rúben Neves. He totalled 30 appearances during his tenure, starting in 16 but being only involved in four team goals.

On 13 July 2022, Trincão signed a one-year loan deal with Sporting CP for a €3 million fee, with a conditional €7 million obligation to buy 50% of his economic rights, with a reported buy-back clause between €20 and €25 million, depending on the moment it was exercised. He made his league debut on 7 August in a 3–3 draw against his former club Braga. His first goal came exactly one month later, his team's second in the 3–0 away win over Eintracht Frankfurt in the Champions League group phase, their first ever victory in Germany.

International career

Youth
In July 2018, Trincão was a member of the Portugal team which won the UEFA European Under-19 Championship beating Italy 4–3 after extra time; he scored once in the match in Seinäjoki, Finland. Along with teammate Jota, he finished joint top scorer in the tournament with five goals, his others being braces against Norway in the first group fixture and Ukraine in a 5–0 semi-final rout. At the 2019 FIFA U-20 World Cup in Poland he played all three games and scored the only goal of the opening win against South Korea, though his side did not advance from the group.

Trincão won his first cap at under-21 level on 5 September 2019, scoring once and being involved in two other goals in the 4–0 win over Gibraltar for the 2021 European Championship qualifiers. He helped the Portuguese to a runners-up finish at the finals in Hungary and Slovenia, scoring a penalty in a 2–0 group defeat of England.

Senior
In August 2020, Trincão had his first senior call-up for UEFA Nations League matches against Croatia and Sweden the following month. He made his debut on 5 September, replacing Bernardo Silva in the 78th minute of a 4–1 home victory over the former.

Trincão was named in a preliminary 55-man squad for the 2022 FIFA World Cup in Qatar, but failed to make the final 26-man cut.

Career statistics

Club

International

Honours
Braga
Taça da Liga: 2019–20

Barcelona
Copa del Rey: 2020–21

Portugal U19
UEFA European Under-19 Championship: 2018

Individual
SJPF Young Player of the Month: January 2020, February 2020
UEFA European Under-19 Championship top scorer: 2018

References

External links

Portuguese League profile 

1999 births
Living people
People from Viana do Castelo
Sportspeople from Viana do Castelo District
Portuguese footballers
Association football wingers
Primeira Liga players
Liga Portugal 2 players
SC Vianense players
S.C. Braga B players
S.C. Braga players
Sporting CP footballers
La Liga players
FC Barcelona players
Premier League players
Wolverhampton Wanderers F.C. players
Portugal youth international footballers
Portugal under-21 international footballers
Portugal international footballers
Portuguese expatriate footballers
Expatriate footballers in Spain
Expatriate footballers in England
Portuguese expatriate sportspeople in Spain
Portuguese expatriate sportspeople in England